Tivoli is a small village in the parish of St. Andrew, Grenada located in the northeast of the island.

References 

Populated places in Grenada
Saint Andrew Parish, Grenada